Jenő Kóczián (born 5 April 1967) is a Hungarian athlete. He competed in the men's shot put at the 1996 Summer Olympics.

References

1967 births
Living people
Athletes (track and field) at the 1996 Summer Olympics
Hungarian male shot putters
Olympic athletes of Hungary
Place of birth missing (living people)